Bernard Thomas (August 22, 1948 – June 16, 2019), better known as Bishop Bullwinkle, was an American singer/comedian best known for appearing in the viral YouTube video "Hell to the Naw Naw". 
Also known for being the main agent in the Kevin chiles case as pointed out by Harlem legend Azie Faison.

Background
Bishop Bullwinkle's real name was Bernard Thomas. The Bullwinkle part of his name came from a childhood nickname; while in school, a classmate of his wrote on the bulletin board, "Bernard Thomas is funny like Bullwinkle the moose". He was based in Florida. He had mixed reactions to his style and song content, drawing both praise and condemnation. He is from Plant City, Florida.

"Hell to the Naw Naw"
In the video which is shot outdoors, Thomas is seen in a white suit, wearing sunglasses and a white hat.  The props used are a podium with a monkey and fire extinguisher resting on it. By July 22, 2015, the video went viral and got over 200,000 views with over 4,000 likes. As of August 15, 2020, a video of the song attracted over 50 million views and 408,000 likes. Another video has attracted over 12 million views and over 218,000 likes. The song was even played on NBC.

A video of an 86-year-old grandmother dancing to the song went viral in a very short time. Beverly Jenkins uploaded the video of her grandmother Claudia Haggerty dancing to the song.  By September 4, 2015, it had attracted 3 million views since it was posted. It was shared over 100,000 times on Facebook.

Bullwinkle attracted mixed reactions for his video and song, which is about the hypocrisy of some preachers and parishioners.

Appearances
Along with Clarence Carter, Sir Charles Jones, Theodis Ealey, and Denise LaSalle, he was scheduled to appear at the 13th Annual Chi-Town Blues Festival at Merrillville's Star Plaza Theatre on March 4, 2017. On March 11, he was scheduled to appear at the 11th Annual Motor City Blues Festival, an event which included Sir Charles Jones, Willie Clayton, Bigg Robb, Shirley Brown, and TK Soul. In June 2017, he was booked to appear at the Southern Soul and Blues Lovers Festival in Tuscaloosa, Alabama. He was booked to appear at the Jacksonville Veterans Memorial Arena on September 9, 2017, but it was rescheduled for Friday, November 10, 2017.

Death
Thomas died on June 16, 2019 from complications of a heart attack. His family confirmed his death. He was 70 years old. The funeral was scheduled 2 weeks later.

Discography

Compilation albums

Singles

As lead artist

As featured artist

References

1948 births
2019 deaths
21st-century African-American male singers
American soul singers
People from Tampa, Florida